Salpingoeca is a genus of Choanoflagellates in the family Salpingoecidae.

References 

 Ultrastructure et mode de nutrition du Choanoflagellé Salpingoeca pelagica, sp. nov. comparaison avec les choanocytes des Spongiaires. M Laval, 1971
 Cell differentiation and morphogenesis in the colony-forming choanoflagellate Salpingoeca rosetta. MJ Dayel, RA Alegado, SR Fairclough, TC Levin... - Developmental biology, 2011
 Premetazoan genome evolution and the regulation of cell differentiation in the choanoflagellate Salpingoeca rosetta
SR Fairclough, Z Chen, E Kramer, Q Zeng, S Young... - Genome biology, 2013

External links 
 

 

Choanoflagellatea
Eukaryote genera